The 2011 NBA draft was held on June 23, 2011, at Prudential Center in Newark, New Jersey. The draft started at 8:00 p.m. Eastern Daylight Time (23:00 UTC), and was broadcast in the United States on ESPN. Kia Motors was the presenting sponsor of the 2011 NBA draft. In this draft, National Basketball Association (NBA) teams took turns selecting amateur U.S. college basketball players and other eligible players, including international players. The Cleveland Cavaliers had the first pick due to a previous trade they had involving the Los Angeles Clippers, choosing point guard Kyrie Irving of Duke. Of the 60 players drafted, 7 were freshmen, 7 were sophomores, 14 were juniors, 19 were seniors, 12 were international players without U.S. college basketball experience (including the first-ever Qatari-selected player), and 1 was a D-League player.

The 2011 NBA draft marked the final time the New Jersey Nets made an NBA draft appearance. After the end of the Nets' 2011–12 season, the franchise relocated to Brooklyn, New York and was renamed to the Brooklyn Nets. The Nets made their first draft appearance with the Brooklyn moniker in 2012. Four of the first-round picks, including three of the top four picks, Kyrie Irving, Derrick Williams, Tristan Thompson, and Iman Shumpert, would all eventually become teammates on the Cleveland Cavaliers. The 2011 draft is considered one of the most loaded drafts in NBA history; seven players in the draft would play in at least two All-Star games and six were selected to at least one All-NBA Team, including the final pick of the draft, Isaiah Thomas.

Draft selections

Notable undrafted players

These players were not selected in the 2011 NBA draft but have played at least one game in the NBA.

Eligibility rules

As of 2010, the basic eligibility rules for the draft are listed below.
 All drafted players must be at least 19 years old during the calendar year of the draft. In terms of dates, players eligible for the 2011 draft must be born on or before December 31, 1992.
 Any player who is not an "international player", as defined in the CBA, must be at least one year removed from the graduation of his high school class. The CBA defines "international players" as players who permanently resided outside the U.S. for three years prior to the draft, did not complete high school in the U.S., and have never enrolled at a U.S. college or university.

The basic requirement for automatic eligibility for a U.S. player is the completion of his college eligibility.

Players who meet the CBA definition of "international players" are automatically eligible if their 22nd birthday falls during or before the calendar year of the draft (i.e., born on or before December 31, 1989). U.S. players who were at least one year removed from their high school graduation and have played minor-league basketball with a team outside the NBA are also automatically eligible.

A player who is not automatically eligible must declare his eligibility for the draft by notifying the NBA offices in writing no later than 60 days before the draft. For the 2011 draft, this date fell on April 24. Under NCAA rules, players will only have until May 8 to withdraw from the draft and maintain their college eligibility. This year, a total of 69 collegiate players and 20 international players declared as early entry candidates. At the withdrawal deadline, 41 early entry candidates withdrew from the draft (25 from US colleges and institutions), leaving 42 collegiate players and six international players as the early entry candidates for the draft.

A player who has hired an agent will forfeit his remaining college eligibility, regardless of whether he is drafted. Also, while the CBA allows a player to withdraw from the draft twice, the NCAA mandates that a player who has declared twice loses his college eligibility.

Draft lottery

The first 14 picks in the draft belong to teams that missed the playoffs; the order will be determined through a lottery. The lottery will determine the three teams that will obtain the first three picks on the draft. The remaining first-round picks and the second-round picks were assigned to teams in reverse order of their win–loss record in the previous season. As it is commonplace in the event of identical win–loss records, the NBA performed a random drawing to break the ties on April 15, 2011.

The lottery was held on May 17, 2011, in Secaucus, New Jersey. The Cleveland Cavaliers, who obtained the Los Angeles Clippers' first-round draft pick, won the lottery. The Cavaliers won the lottery with a 22.7% chance to win, combining a 19.9% chance from their own pick and 2.8% chance from the Clippers' pick. However, their winning lottery combination came from the Clippers' pick, which had a significantly lower chance to win. The Minnesota Timberwolves, who had the worst record and the biggest chance to win the lottery, won the second pick. The Utah Jazz, who obtained the New Jersey Nets' first-round draft pick, won the third pick.

Below were the chances for each team to get specific picks in the 2011 draft lottery, rounded to three decimal places.

Entrants

Early entrants

College underclassmen
(All players are Americans except as indicated)

 Alec Burks – G, Colorado (sophomore)
 DeAngelo Casto – C, Washington State (junior)
 Roscoe Davis – F, Midland JC (TX) (freshman)
 Mamadou Diarra – C, Chaminade (junior)
 Jeremy Green – G, Stanford (junior)
 Jordan Hamilton – G/F, Texas (sophomore)
 Tobias Harris – F, Tennessee (freshman)
 Tyler Honeycutt – F, UCLA (sophomore)
 Scotty Hopson – G, Tennessee (junior)
 Kyrie Irving – G, Duke (freshman)
 Reggie Jackson – G, Boston College (junior)
 Terrence Jennings – F, Louisville (junior)
  Cory Joseph – G, Texas (freshman) 
  Enes Kanter – F/C, Kentucky (freshman) 
Although Kanter enrolled at Kentucky, he never played because he was declared ineligible by the NCAA due to financial benefits he had received from his previous Turkish club, Fenerbahçe Ülker.
 Ryan Kelley – G, Colorado (sophomore)
 Dan Kelm – G, Viterbo (WI) (sophomore)
 Brandon Knight – G, Kentucky (freshman)
 Malcolm Lee – G, UCLA (junior)
 Kawhi Leonard – F, San Diego State (sophomore)
 Travis Leslie – G, Georgia (junior)

 DeAndre Liggins – G, Kentucky (junior)
 Shelvin Mack – G, Butler (junior)
 Keishawn Mayes – F, Campbell (junior)
 Darius Morris – G, Michigan (sophomore)
 Marcus Morris – F, Kansas (junior)
 Markieff Morris – F, Kansas (junior)
 Willie Reed – F, Saint Louis (junior)
 Jereme Richmond – G/F, Illinois (freshman)
 Carleton Scott – F, Notre Dame (junior)
 Josh Selby – G, Kansas (freshman)
 Iman Shumpert – G, Georgia Tech (junior)
 Chris Singleton – F, Florida State (junior)
 Greg Smith – C, Fresno State (sophomore)
 Isaiah Thomas – G, Washington (junior)
 Trey Thompkins – F, Georgia (junior)
 Klay Thompson – G, Washington State (junior)
  Tristan Thompson – F, Texas (freshman) 
  Nikola Vučević – F, USC (junior) 
 Kemba Walker – G, Connecticut (junior)
 Antoine Watson – G, Florida International (junior)
 Derrick Williams – F, Arizona (sophomore)
 Jordan Williams – F, Maryland (sophomore)

International players
This list is restricted to players who meet the CBA definition of "international" players.
  Dāvis Bertāns – F, Olimpija Ljubljana (Slovenia)
  Bismack Biyombo – F, Baloncesto Fuenlabrada (Spain)
  Nikola Mirotić – F, Real Madrid (Spain)
  Donatas Motiejūnas – F, Benetton Treviso (Italy)
  Jonas Valančiūnas – C, Lietuvos Rytas (Lithuania)
  Jan Veselý – F, Partizan Belgrade (Serbia)

Automatically eligible entrants
Players who do not meet the criteria for "international" players are automatically eligible if they meet any of the following criteria:
 They have completed 4 years of their college eligibility.
 If they graduated from high school in the U.S., but did not enroll in a U.S. college or university, four years have passed since their high school class graduated.
 They have signed a contract with a professional basketball team outside of the NBA, anywhere in the world, and have played under that contract.

Players who meet the criteria for "international" players are automatically eligible if they meet any of the following criteria:
 They are least 22 years old during the calendar year of the draft. In terms of dates, players born on or before December 31, 1989, are automatically eligible for the 2011 draft.
 They have signed a contract with a professional basketball team outside of the NBA within the United States, and have played under that contract.

Invited attendees
The NBA annually invites 10 to 15 players to sit in the so-called "green room", a special room set aside at the draft site for the invited players plus their families and agents. This season, the following players were invited (listed alphabetically):
  Bismack Biyombo, Baloncesto Fuenlabrada (not on the original list; added later)
  Alec Burks, Colorado
  Jimmer Fredette, Brigham Young
  Kyrie Irving, Duke
  Enes Kanter, Kentucky
  Brandon Knight, Kentucky
  Kawhi Leonard, San Diego State
  Marcus Morris, Kansas
  Markieff Morris, Kansas (not on the original list; added later)
  Donatas Motiejūnas, Benetton Treviso
  Chris Singleton, Florida State
  Klay Thompson, Washington State
  Tristan Thompson, Texas
  Jonas Valančiūnas, Lietuvos Rytas
  Jan Veselý, Partizan Belgrade
  Kemba Walker, Connecticut
  Derrick Williams, Arizona

Trades involving draft picks

Pre-draft trades
Prior to the day of the draft, the following trades were made and resulted in exchanges of draft picks between the teams.
 On February 24, 2011, the Cleveland Cavaliers acquired Baron Davis and a 2011 first-round draft pick from the Los Angeles Clippers in exchange for Mo Williams and Jamario Moon.
 On February 23, 2011, the Utah Jazz acquired Devin Harris, Derrick Favors, New Jersey's 2011 first-round draft pick and Golden State's 2012 first-round draft pick from the New Jersey Nets in exchange for Deron Williams.
 On February 22, 2011, the Chicago Bulls acquired Miami's 2011 first-round draft pick (the 28th pick) from the Toronto Raptors in exchange for James Johnson. Previously, on July 9, 2010, the Raptors re-acquired their 2011 first-round draft pick (the 5th pick) while also acquiring Miami's 2011 first-round draft pick (the 28th pick) and a trade exception from the Miami Heat in exchange for Chris Bosh. Previously, on February 14, 2009, the Heat acquired Jermaine O'Neal, Jamario Moon, a 2011 first-round draft pick (the 5th pick) and a 2010 second-round draft pick from the Raptors in exchange for Shawn Marion, Marcus Banks and cash considerations.
 On February 23, 2011, the Washington Wizards acquired Mike Bibby, Maurice Evans, Jordan Crawford and a 2011 first-round draft pick from the Atlanta Hawks in exchange for Kirk Hinrich and Hilton Armstrong.
 On February 23, 2011, the Charlotte Bobcats acquired Joel Przybilla, Dante Cunningham, Sean Marks, New Orleans' 2011 first-round draft pick, Portland's 2013 conditional first-round draft pick and cash considerations from the Portland Trail Blazers in exchange for Gerald Wallace. Previously, on October 23, 2010, the Blazers acquired a 2011 first-round draft pick from the New Orleans Hornets in exchange for Jerryd Bayless.
 On July 13, 2010, the Minnesota Timberwolves acquired Kosta Koufos, Memphis's 2011 first-round draft pick and Utah's 2012 conditional first-round draft pick from the Utah Jazz in exchange for Al Jefferson. Previously, on February 18, 2010, the Jazz acquired a 2011 first-round draft pick from the Memphis Grizzlies in exchange for Ronnie Brewer.
 On February 24, 2011, the Houston Rockets acquired Goran Dragić and Orlando's 2011 first-round draft pick from the Phoenix Suns in exchange for Aaron Brooks. Previously, on December 18, 2010, the Suns acquired Vince Carter, Marcin Gortat, Mickaël Piétrus, a 2011 first-round draft pick and cash considerations from the Orlando Magic in exchange for Jason Richardson, Hedo Türkoğlu and Earl Clark.
 On December 15, 2010, the New Jersey Nets acquired Sasha Vujačić and a 2011 first-round draft pick from the Los Angeles Lakers, while the Lakers acquired Joe Smith, Golden State's 2011 and Chicago's 2012 second-round draft picks from the Nets in a three-team trade with the Lakers and the Houston Rockets. Previously, the Nets acquired a 2011 second-round draft pick from the Golden State Warriors as a compensation for delaying the sending of the 2011 conditional first-round draft pick to at least 2012. In the original trade on July 22, 2008, the Nets acquired a 2011 conditional first-round draft pick on July 22, 2008, from the Golden State Warriors in exchange for Marcus Williams.
 On July 12, 2010, the Miami Heat acquired 2011 and 2014 second-round draft picks and cash considerations from the Minnesota Timberwolves in exchange for Michael Beasley.
 On June 15, 2007, the Detroit Pistons acquired 2009 and 2011 second-round draft picks from the Toronto Raptors in exchange for Carlos Delfino.
 On February 16, 2009, the Los Angeles Clippers acquired Alex Acker and a 2011 second-round draft pick from the Detroit Pistons in exchange for a 2013 conditional second-round draft pick.
 On August 6, 2008, the Houston Rockets acquired the option to swap 2011 second-round draft picks from the Los Angeles Clippers in exchange for Steve Novak. The option to swap 2011 second-round draft picks was exercised.
 On July 8, 2010, the Chicago Bulls acquired Carlos Boozer and a 2011 second-round draft pick from the Utah Jazz in exchange for a trade exception.
 On July 22, 2010, the Golden State Warriors acquired Phoenix's 2011 second-round draft pick and a trade exception from the Chicago Bulls in exchange for C. J. Watson. Previously, on July 9, 2010, the Bulls acquired a second-round draft pick from the Phoenix Suns in exchange for Hakim Warrick.
 On September 29, 2010, the New Orleans Hornets acquired Willie Green, Jason Smith and the option to swap 2011 second-round draft picks from the Philadelphia 76ers in exchange for Darius Songaila and Craig Brackins. The option to swap 2011 second-round draft picks was exercised.
 On June 26, 2009, the Los Angeles Lakers acquired a 2011 second-round draft pick and cash considerations from the New York Knicks in exchange for the draft rights to Toney Douglas.
 On July 13, 2009, the Detroit Pistons acquired a 2011 second-round draft pick from the Denver Nuggets in exchange for Arron Afflalo, Walter Sharpe and cash considerations.
 On July 10, 2010, the Cleveland Cavaliers acquired two first-round draft picks, New Orleans' 2012 and Oklahoma City's second-round draft picks, the option to swap 2012 first-round draft picks and a trade exception from the Miami Heat in exchange for LeBron James. Previously, on June 24, 2010, the Heat acquired a 2011 second-round pick from the Oklahoma City Thunder in exchange for the draft rights to Latavious Williams.
 On June 26, 2009, the Los Angeles Lakers acquired a 2011 second-round draft pick and cash considerations from the Miami Heat in exchange for the draft rights to Patrick Beverley.
 On July 21, 2010, the Sacramento Kings acquired Darnell Jackson and a 2011 second-round draft pick from the Milwaukee Bucks in exchange for Jon Brockman. Previously, on February 18, 2010, the Bucks acquired John Salmons, the option to swap 2010 first-round draft pick, 2011 and 2012 second-round draft picks from the Chicago Bulls in exchange for Hakim Warrick and Joe Alexander.

Draft-day trades
The following trades involving drafted players were made on the day of the draft.

 In a three-team trade, the Charlotte Bobcats acquired Corey Maggette from the Milwaukee Bucks and the draft rights to 7th pick Bismack Biyombo from the Sacramento Kings, the Kings acquired John Salmons and the draft rights to 10th pick Jimmer Fredette from the Bucks, and the Bucks acquired Beno Udrih from the Kings, Stephen Jackson, Shaun Livingston and the draft rights to 19th pick Tobias Harris from the Bobcats.
 The Indiana Pacers acquired George Hill from the San Antonio Spurs in exchange for the draft rights to 15th pick Kawhi Leonard, 42nd pick Dāvis Bertāns and the draft rights to Erazem Lorbek, the 46th pick in 2005.
 The Houston Rockets acquired Jonny Flynn, the draft rights to 20th pick Donatas Motiejūnas and a 2012 second-round draft pick from the Minnesota Timberwolves in exchange for Brad Miller, the draft rights to 23rd pick Nikola Mirotić, 38th pick Chandler Parsons and a future first-round draft pick. The Rockets then re-acquired the draft rights to Parsons from the Timberwolves in exchange for cash considerations.
 The Chicago Bulls acquired the draft rights to 23rd pick Nikola Mirotić from the Minnesota Timberwolves in exchange for the draft rights to 28th pick Norris Cole, 43rd pick Malcolm Lee and cash considerations.
 The New Jersey Nets acquired the draft rights to 25th pick Marshon Brooks from the Boston Celtics in exchange for the draft rights to 27th pick JaJuan Johnson and a 2014 second-round draft pick.
 In a three-team trade, the Denver Nuggets acquired the draft rights to 26th pick Jordan Hamilton from the Dallas Mavericks, Andre Miller and a future second-round draft pick from the Portland Trail Blazers, the Mavericks acquired Rudy Fernández and the draft rights to Petteri Koponen, the 30th pick in 2007, from the Blazers, and the Blazers acquired Raymond Felton from the Nuggets and the draft rights to 57th pick Tanguy Ngombo from the Mavericks.
 The Miami Heat acquired the draft rights to 28th pick Norris Cole from the Minnesota Timberwolves in exchange for the draft rights to 31st pick Bojan Bogdanović, a 2014 second-round draft pick and cash considerations.
 The New Jersey Nets acquired the draft rights to 31st pick Bojan Bogdanović from the Minnesota Timberwolves in exchange for a 2013 second-round draft pick and cash considerations.
 The Orlando Magic acquired the draft rights to 32nd pick Justin Harper from the Cleveland Cavaliers in exchange for 2013 and 2014 second-round draft picks.
 The Golden State Warriors acquired the draft rights to 39th pick Jeremy Tyler from the Charlotte Bobcats in exchange for cash considerations.
 The New York Knicks acquired the draft rights to 45th pick Josh Harrellson from the New Orleans Hornets in exchange for cash considerations.
 The Denver Nuggets acquired the draft rights to 56th pick Chukwudiebere Maduabum from the Los Angeles Lakers in exchange for a future second-round draft pick.

See also
 List of first overall NBA draft picks

References
General

Specific

External links
NBA.com: Draft 2011

Draft
National Basketball Association draft
NBA draft
NBA draft
21st century in Newark, New Jersey
Events in Newark, New Jersey
Basketball in Newark, New Jersey